Dilophus febrilis is a species of feverfly the family Bibionidae. It is found in the Palearctic.

References

External links
BioLib

Bibionidae
Flies described in 1758
Nematoceran flies of Europe
Taxa named by Carl Linnaeus